Camp Crook may refer to:
 Camp Crook, South Dakota
 Camp Crook (Montana), a former military installation in Montana